Buchanan, originally named Mouth of Bear, is an unincorporated community located in Lawrence County, Kentucky, United States at the mouth of Bear Creek where it joins the Big Sandy River, five miles downstream from the mouth of Blaine Creek.

Its post office was established on 1830-01-14 by county surveyor Reuben Canterbury (alternatively spelled Canterberry), named Canterbury after himself.
It was later renamed Turman's Ferry in March 1838, by new postmaster and ferryman Benjamin Turman.
It was known as Round Bottom when it was relocated across the river (and state line) to Prichard, West Virginia in June 1853, and then as Buchanan (after then postmaster George Buchanan) when it was relocated back on the creek mouth side of the river in September 1861.

But in 1891 the railway station and the community were both (re)named Buchanan after the post office.
By that time, the community itself comprised several lumber and livestock operations, a hotel, a flour mill, a wagonworks, and some stores.

The post office closed in 1976, having been a rural branch of the Louisa, Kentucky post office since August 1863.

Cross-reference

Sources 

 

Unincorporated communities in Lawrence County, Kentucky
Unincorporated communities in Kentucky